

Brunton Bank Quarry is a disused quarry now designated as a Site of Special Scientific Interest (SSSI) in Northumberland, North East England. The quarry exposes a base layer of the Namurian Great Limestone stratigraphic unit, including the Chaetetes Band, the fossilised fauna within which is of current geological interest.

Location and natural features

Brunton Bank Quarry is one of a number of SSSIs which expose the Namurian Great Limestone; others include Sleightholme Beck Gorge – The Troughs and West Rigg Open Cutting, both to the south of this site, in County Durham.

An ancient tumulus is noted within the boundary of the site.

Geology
Brunton Bank Quarry is identified as an important geological site in the UK's Geological Conservation Review, for its stratigraphic and palaeontological characteristics. It provides an excellent exposure of the reef-like biostromic Chaetetes Band of the Namurian Great Limestone, the affinities of the flora of which is a subject of contemporary study: the quarry constitutes a leading site for such studies. The site is the sole location of one eponymous fossil species Calcifolium bruntonense.

The condition of Brunton Bank Quarry was judged to be favourable in a 2013 inspection, which noted recent scrub clearance.

See also
List of Sites of Special Scientific Interest in Northumberland

References

External links
Natural England SSSI record for Brunton Bank Quarry

Quarries in England
Sites of Special Scientific Interest in Northumberland
Sites of Special Scientific Interest notified in 1969
Wall, Northumberland